James A. Usilton Sr. (June 10, 1895 – March 13, 1939) was an American college basketball coach at Temple University between 1926–27 and 1938–39. He won 205 games as the Owls' coach, including one National Invitation Tournament (NIT) during the 1937–38 season. That Temple squad won the first-ever NIT. His 1937–38 team was also retroactively named the national champion by the Helms Athletic Foundation and the Premo-Porretta Power Poll. His 1935–36 team reached the finals of the 1936 Olympic Trials.

Head coaching record

References

External links
 

1895 births
1939 deaths
Basketball coaches from Pennsylvania
High school basketball coaches in Pennsylvania
Sportspeople from Philadelphia
Temple Owls men's basketball coaches
Temple University alumni